J. B. Turner was an Australian cricketer. He played two first-class cricket matches for Victoria between 1865 and 1867.

See also
 List of Victoria first-class cricketers

References

Year of birth missing
Year of death missing
Australian cricketers
Victoria cricketers
Place of birth missing
Melbourne Cricket Club cricketers